The 2020 Santos Women's Tour Down Under was a women's cycle stage race held in Australia from 16 to 19 January, 2018. The Women's Tour Down Under, being held for the eighth time, was held as a UCI rating of 2.1 race.

Route

Classification leadership table
In the 2020 Women's Tour Down Under, four different jerseys were awarded. For the general classification, calculated by adding each cyclist's finishing times on each stage, and allowing time bonuses for the first three finishers at intermediate sprints and at the finish of mass-start stages, the leader received an ochre jersey. This classification was considered the most important of the 2020 Women's Tour Down Under, and the winner of the classification was considered the winner of the race.

References

External links

2018 in Australian sport
January 2018 sports events in Australia